The Tinderbox is a 1946 Danish animated film directed by Svend Methling and produced by Dansk Farve- og Tegnefilm, Palladium, It is the first full-length Danish and European animated film ever made. It was an adaption of Hans Christian Andersen's popular fairytale of the same name. The film was in colour. The project was inspired by the works of Walt Disney and Max and Dave Fleischer, especially their "Gulliver's Travels" (1939).

Cast 
 Poul Reichhardt - the Soldier
 Kirsten Hermansen - the Princess
 Knud Heglund - the King
 Karen Poulsen - the Witch
 Elith Foss - the Astrological Signer
 Viggo Brodthagen
 Ole Monty
 Aage Winther-Jørgensen
 Vera Lindstrøm
 Victor Montell
 Vera Lense-Møller
 Axel Larsen
 Adelheid Nielsen
 Einar Reim
 Anna Henriques-Nielsen
 Carl Johan Hviid
 Ingeborg Steffensen
 Ulf Kaarsberg

Production took place from June 1943 until the 1945 at Frederiksberggade 28 in Copenhagen. During the production process, publisher Dansk Farve- og Tegnefilm kept a low profile, but the press still published a few articles about the project.

References 

1946 films
1946 animated films
Danish animated fantasy films
Films based on works by Hans Christian Andersen
Films based on fairy tales